Raw Silk was an American dance band, which originated in New York.

History
Raw Silk first signed to West End Records, which was once a popular garage label, where they recorded moderate hits. Their songs were remixed by post-disco/R&B production duo Nick Martinelli and David Todd.

Raw Silk consisted of two Crown Heights Affair members, Ron Dean Miller and Bert Reid, and three female vocalists; Jessica Cleaves, Tenita Jordan and Sybil Thomas. They are best known for their 1982 garage-boogie hit, "Do It to the Music". Their production was somewhat successful, "Do It to the Music" reached number five on the US Billboard Dance Club Songs chart, "Just in Time" (1983) peaked lower, at number 40 on the same chart. "Do It to the Music" was more successful on the UK Singles Chart, peaking at number 18.

Chart performance

Discography

Singles
"Do It to the Music"

"Just in Time"

References

External links
 Raw Silk at Discogs.

American garage house musicians
American contemporary R&B musical groups
American dance music groups
American boogie musicians
Musical groups established in 1979
Musical groups disestablished in 1983
Musical groups from New York City
West End Records artists
Arista Records artists